Haydarpur or Haydor Pur is a village in northeastern Bangladesh in Bhatgaon Union of Chhatak Upazila, in Sunamganj District, within the division of Sylhet Division. Agriculture is the primary occupation of the village.

Nearby villages
 East: Jhigli
 West: Sripatipur
 North: Mandalpur
 South: Sonuakai

Education
 Haydor Pur High School (established in 1999)
 Haydor Pur Government Primary School (established in 1954)
 Haydor Pur Islamia Hafizia Madrasa (established in 1990)

See also
 List of villages in Bangladesh

References

Villages in Chhatak Upazila